Eucalyptus placita, commonly known as grey ironbark or simply, ironbark, is a species of small to medium-sized tree that is endemic to New South Wales. It has rough, furrowed grey but soft ironbark on the trunk and branches, glossy green, lance-shaped adult leaves, flower buds in groups of seven, white flowers and conical fruit.

Description
It has rough, furrowed grey bark that is unusually soft for an ironbark. Flowering has been recorded in April, June, September and October and the flowers are white.

Taxonomy and naming
Eucalyptus placita was first formally described in 1990 by Lawrie Johnson and Ken Hill in the journal Telopea. The specific epithet (placita) is from the Latin placitus meaning "pleasing", referring to the colour of the leaves.

Distribution and habitat
Grey ironbark grows in moist areas in the mid north coast region of New South Wales, from Cessnock to Kempsey.

References

Myrtales of Australia
Flora of New South Wales
Trees of Australia
placita
Plants described in 1990